The Karun 4 (Karun IV) Arch Bridge is an arch deck bridge in Lordegan, Chaharmahal and Bakhtiari province, Iran.

It has a  arch span. The  total length of the bridge comprises 15+17+300+17+17+12m span arrangement. This arch deck bridge has an orthotropic deck system with  total width which incorporates a two-way carriageway and a walkway at each side. It weighs 3875 tons and is constructed of 1212 pieces. The bridge construction finished in 2013 and opened to traffic in 2015.

The bridge flies over Karun-4 Dam Reservoir in Chaharmahal and Bakhtiari, Iran.

It has the longest arch bridge span in the Middle East and is the 49th longest arch bridge in the world.

References

Bridges in Iran
Buildings and structures in Chaharmahal and Bakhtiari Province